The Other Side of Absolute Ego is a remix album by Aco. It consists of remixes of selected songs from Aco's fourth studio album Absolute Ego. It was released via Ki/oon Records on March 23, 2000.

Track listing

References

External links
 

2000 remix albums
Aco (musician) albums
Ki/oon Records albums